Willett is a neighborhood in Columbus, Georgia. It is located southwest of the central business district of Downtown.

Columbus metropolitan area, Georgia
Neighborhoods in Columbus, Georgia